Silver jubilee marks a 25th anniversary, also known as a quadranscentennial anniversary. The anniversary celebrations can be of a wedding anniversary, the 25th year of a monarch's reign or anything that has completed or entering a 25-year mark.

Royal silver jubilees since 1750

South Asian film terminology
In India and Pakistan, a silver jubilee film is commonly described as a movie shown continuously in cinemas in one city for 25 straight weeks without any interruptions.

See also 

 Hierarchy of precious substances
 List of longest-reigning monarchs
 Wedding anniversary

References

 
Anniversaries